Dajing River is a river of China. It flows into the South China Sea.

See also
List of rivers in China

Rivers of China
Tributaries of the Pearl River (China)